The 1970 ISF Women's World Championship for softball was held in Osaka, Japan.

Final standings 

The other competitors were:

References

Womens Softball World Championship
Women's Softball World Championship
1970